The United Nations Participation Act of 1945 was a law passed by the United States Congress in 1945, dealing with the process of United States joining the newly created United Nations and related bodies of the United Nations. This act provides the basic authority for U.S. participation as a member of the United Nations Organization. In particular, it is the authority for the president to apply economic and other sanctions against a target country or its nationals pursuant to mandatory decisions by the United Nations Security Council under Article 41 of the United Nations Charter.

This act also dealt with immigration issues in regard to immigration policy be conducted in a fair manner and non-discriminatory fashion.

References

 Avalon Project
 United Nations Participation Act (1945)
 The Commander in Chief and United Nations Charter Article 43: A Case of Irreconcilable Differences?
 Rethinking War Powers: Congress, The President, and the United Nations

United States foreign relations legislation
United States federal immigration and nationality legislation
United States and the United Nations
1945 in American law